Staroye Gushchino is a rural locality (a village) in Kosinskoye Rural Settlement, Kosinsky District, Perm Krai, Russia. The population was 4 as of 2010. There is 1 street.

Geography 
Staroye Gushchino is located 6 km south of Kosa (the district's administrative centre) by road. Novoye Gushchino is the nearest rural locality.

References 

Rural localities in Kosinsky District